Madhusree Mukerjee (born 1961) is an Indian-American physicist, writer, editor, and journalist. She is the author of The Land of Naked People: Encounters with Stone Age Islanders (2003) and Churchill's Secret War: The British Empire and the Ravaging of India during World War II (2010). She is a contributor to the People's Archive of Rural India and a senior editor with Scientific American.

Early life and education 
Mukerjee was born in West Bengal, India. She is a graduate of Jadavpur University with a degree in physics. After obtaining a Ph.D. in physics from the University of Chicago—supervised by Yoichiro Nambu—she began post-doctoral studies at the California Institute of Technology (Caltech).

Career 
After completing her post-doctoral studies at Caltech, Mukerjee took up science journalism and worked for Physics Today for one year and since 2003, she has worked for Scientific American, where she is the senior editor for science and society.<ref>Sophie Bushwick, Madhusree Mukerjee, ChatGPT Explains Why AIs like ChatGPT Should Be Regulated, Scientific American, December 28, 2022</ref> 

She received a Guggenheim fellowship to complete her first book, entitled The Land of Naked People (2003). In her second book, entitled Churchill's Secret War'' (2010), Mukerjee documents the role played by the policies, as well as the racial and political worldview, of the war-time Prime Minister Winston Churchill and his trusted friend and advisor, Frederick Lindemann, in the death and devastation caused by the Bengal famine of 1943 and the partition of India.

Personal life 
During 2011, Mukerjee was living in Germany with her husband, who teaches physics at Frankfurt University, and their son.

Selected works

References

External links 
 The Prime Minister and the Prof, Revisionist History (podcast) (interview with Mukerjee)
 
 

1961 births
Living people
21st-century American women
American women journalists
American writers of Indian descent
Scientific American people
University of Chicago alumni